The 1986–87 Northwestern Wildcats men's basketball team represented Northwestern University during the 1986–87 NCAA Division I men's basketball season.

Roster

References

Northwestern Wildcats men's basketball seasons
Northwestern